Jacques Hébert (8 August 1920 – 15 February 2018) was a French politician.

Born on 8 August 1920 in Falaise, Calvados, Hébert ended his medical studies at the age of 20 to join the Free French Forces. For his military service, Hébert was named a Grand Officier of the Legion of Honour and received an Order of Liberation. He was elected mayor of Cherbourg in 1959 and stepped down in 1977. Between 1963 and 1973, Hébert represented the fifth constituency of Manche in the National Assembly. He died in Falaise, Calvados, at the age of 97 on 15 February 2018.

References

1920 births
2018 deaths
People from Falaise, Calvados
Politicians from Normandy
Union for the New Republic politicians
Union of Democrats for the Republic politicians
Rally for the Republic politicians
Deputies of the 2nd National Assembly of the French Fifth Republic
Deputies of the 3rd National Assembly of the French Fifth Republic
Deputies of the 4th National Assembly of the French Fifth Republic
Mayors of places in Normandy
Free French military personnel of World War II
Grand Officiers of the Légion d'honneur
Companions of the Liberation